The serows ( or ) are four species of medium-sized goat-like or antelope-like mammals of the genus Capricornis. All four species of serow were until recently also classified under Naemorhedus, which now only contains the gorals.

Extant species
This genus has been studied and organized a number of times. In 2005, Mammal Species of the World 3rd ed. listed six different species (C. crispus, C. milneedwardsii, C. rubidus, C. sumatraensis, C. swinhoei, and C. thar), with two subspecies of C. milneedwardsii. The current consensus are the following four species, with milneedwardsii and thar demoted to subspecies of C. sumatraensis:

Serows live in central and eastern Asia. Their coloration varies by species, region, and individual. Both sexes have beards and small horns which are often shorter than their ears.

Like their smaller relatives the gorals, serows are often found grazing on rocky hills, though typically at a lower elevation when one species of each share territory. Serows are slower and less agile than gorals, but they nevertheless can climb slopes to escape predation, and to take shelter during cold winters or hot summers. Serows, unlike gorals, make use of their preorbital glands in scent marking.

Fossils of serow-like animals date as far back as the late Pliocene, two to seven million years ago. The common ancestor species of the Caprinae subfamily may have been very similar to modern serows. 

The serow subfamily population as a whole is considered endangered. Most serow species are included in the red list of IUCN with decreasing populations. The Japanese serow is better protected than the other sub-species of serows.

References

External links